The Lady Vanishes is a 1938 film by Alfred Hitchcock and starring Margaret Lockwood.

The Lady Vanishes may also refer to:
The Lady Vanishes (novel) or The Wheel Spins, a 1936 mystery novel by Ethel Lina White
The Lady Vanishes (1979 film), a film starring Cybill Shepherd
The Lady Vanishes (2013 film), a film starring Tuppence Middleton
"The Lady Vanishes", an episode of The Commish
"The Lady Vanishes", an episode of Dallas
"The Lady Vanishes", a 2012 episode of The Fifth Estate
"The Lady Vanishes", an episode of 2point4 children
"The Lady Vanishes", an episode of Sexton Blake
"The Lady Vanishes", an episode of Wings